The solar luminosity, is a unit of radiant flux (power emitted in the form of photons) conventionally used by astronomers to measure the luminosity of stars, galaxies and other celestial objects in terms of the output of the Sun.

One nominal solar luminosity is defined by the International Astronomical Union to be . The Sun is a weakly variable star, and its actual luminosity therefore fluctuates. The major fluctuation is the eleven-year solar cycle (sunspot cycle) that causes a quasi-periodic variation of about ±0.1%. Other variations over the last 200–300 years are thought to be much smaller than this.

Determination 
Solar luminosity is related to solar irradiance (the solar constant). Solar irradiance is responsible for the orbital forcing that causes the Milankovitch cycles, which determine Earthly glacial cycles. The mean irradiance at the top of the Earth's atmosphere is sometimes known as the solar constant, . Irradiance is defined as power per unit area, so the solar luminosity (total power emitted by the Sun) is the irradiance received at the Earth (solar constant) multiplied by the area of the sphere whose radius is the mean distance between the Earth and the Sun:

See also
 Sun
 Solar mass
 Solar radius
 Nuclear fusion
 Active region
 Triple-alpha process

References

Further reading

External links 
LISIRD: LASP Interactive Solar Irradiance Datacenter
Stellar Luminosity Calculator
Solar Luminosity 
Variation of Solar Luminosity

Luminosity
Stellar astronomy
Units of power
Units of measurement in astronomy